The Acts of Supremacy are two acts passed by the Parliament of England in the 16th century that established the English monarchs as the head of the Church of England; two similar laws were passed by the Parliament of Ireland establishing the English monarchs as the head of the Church of Ireland. The 1534 Act declared King Henry VIII and his successors as the Supreme Head of the Church, replacing the pope. This first Act was repealed during the reign of the Catholic Queen Mary I. The 1558 Act declared Queen Elizabeth I and her successors the Supreme Governor of the Church, a title that the British monarch still holds.

First Act of Supremacy 1534 

The first Act of Supremacy was passed on 3 November 1534 (26 Hen. VIII c. 1) by the Parliament of England. It granted King Henry VIII of England and subsequent monarchs Royal Supremacy, such that he was declared the Supreme Head of the Church of England. Royal Supremacy is specifically used to describe the legal sovereignty of the civil laws over the laws of the Church in England.

The act declared that the king was "the only supreme head on Earth of the Church of England" and that the Crown shall enjoy "all honours, dignities, preeminences, jurisdictions, privileges, authorities, immunities, profits, and commodities to the said dignity." The wording of the act made clear that Parliament was not granting the king the title (thereby suggesting that they had the right to withdraw it later); rather, it was acknowledging an established fact. In the Act of Supremacy, Henry abandoned Rome completely. He thereby asserted the independence of the Ecclesia Anglicana. He appointed himself and his successors as the supreme rulers of the English church. Earlier, Henry had been declared "Defender of the Faith" (Fidei defensor) in 1521 by Pope Leo X for his pamphlet accusing Martin Luther of heresy. Parliament later conferred this title upon Henry in 1544.

The 1534 Act marks the beginning of the English Reformation. There were a number of reasons for this Act, primarily the need for a male heir to the throne. Henry tried for years to obtain an annulment of his marriage to Catherine of Aragon, and had convinced himself that God was punishing him for marrying his brother's widow. 
Pope Clement VII refused to grant the annulment because, according to Roman Catholic teaching, a validly contracted marriage is indissoluble until death, and thus the pope cannot annul a marriage simply because of a canonical impediment previously dispensed. The Treasons Act was later passed: it provided that to disavow the Act of Supremacy and to deprive the king of his "dignity, title, or name" was to be considered treason. The most famous public figure to resist the Treasons Act was Sir Thomas More.

Irish Act of Supremacy 1537 

In 1537, the Irish Supremacy Act (28 Hen 8 c. 5, An Act authorising the King, His Heirs and Successors, to be supreme Head of the Church of Ireland) was passed by the Parliament of Ireland, establishing Henry VIII as the supreme head of the Church of Ireland, as had earlier been done in England.

Second Act of Supremacy 1558 

Henry VIII's Act of Supremacy was repealed in 1554 during the reign of his staunchly Roman Catholic daughter, Queen Mary I. Upon her death in November 1558, her Protestant half-sister Elizabeth I succeeded to the throne. The first Elizabethan Parliament passed the Act of Supremacy 1558, which declared Elizabeth the Supreme Governor of the Church of England, instituted an Oath of Supremacy, requiring anyone taking public or church clergymen to swear allegiance to the monarch as head of the Church and state. Anyone refusing to take the oath could be charged with treason.

The use of the term Supreme Governor as opposed to Supreme Head pacified some Roman Catholics and those Protestants concerned about a female leader of the Church of England. Elizabeth, who was a politique, did not prosecute nonconformist laymen, or those who did not follow the established rules of the Church of England unless their actions directly undermined the authority of the English monarch, as was the case in the vestments controversy. Thus, it was through the Second Act of Supremacy that Elizabeth I officially established the now reformed Church of England. This was a part of the Elizabethan Religious Settlement.

Historian G. R. Elton argues that, "in law and political theory the Elizabethan supremacy was essentially parliamentary, while Henry VIII's had been essentially personal." The royal supremacy was extinguished during the British Interregnum from 1649, but was restored in 1660. The Stuart kings used it as a justification for controlling the appointment of bishops.

The conflation in the Crown of supreme slay authority over church and state made every secular subject of the Crown a spiritual subject of the Church as well; the Church was co-extensive with the State.  Contemporary English theologian Richard Hooker described the situation thus:

Irish Act of Supremacy 1560

In 1560, the Parliament of Ireland passed "".

See also

 Supreme Governor of the Church of England
 State religion
 Dissolution of the Monasteries

Notes

References

External links
Original text of the 1534 Act of Supremacy.

 Image of the original 1534 Act of Supremacy

1534 in law
1534 in England
Constitutional laws of England
Parliamentary Acts of the English Reformation
Acts of the Parliament of England concerning religion
1534 in Christianity